Tunji Sowande was a Nigeria-born United Kingdom lawyer and musician.

Early life 
Tunji Sowande was born in Lagos, Nigeria in 1912 to well off and musical family. His brother was Fela Sowande. His father was the Anglican Priest, Emmanuel Sowande, a pioneer of church music in Lagos and a contemporary of the classical composer and organist Ekundayo Phillips.

Tunji Sowande had his early education at the CMS Anglican Grammar School in Lagos and the Yaba Higher College, where he obtained a Diploma in Pharmacy in about 1940. He worked with the Public Health department in Lagos as a Dispensing Pharmacist for a number of years. His contemporary being the late Adeyinka Oyekan, who was to become the Oba (King) of Lagos. He is also said  to have  set up a private Pharmacy business alongside the said Oyekan

Tunji was an excellent Baritone Singer, Organist, and later a Jazz Drummer and Saxophonist. Largely plying his musical skills in the conservative surroundings of the Anglican Cathedral in Lagos in his spare-time.

He married in 1938 and had two children, Ayo and Tunde who joined him in the UK, where they were educated, before returning to Nigeria as adults.

Education in the UK 
In 1945, he decided to travel to the United Kingdom to pursue a career in Law, though his personal account was more to the effect that he wanted a change of scene to pursue his musical skills, with legal studies being an adjunct to his genuine quest.

He studied law at King's College London and took and passed the Bar Finals at Lincoln's Inn, having said that he occupied himself primarily playing around the UK, supporting several acts both Jazz, Classical and Choral. He collaborated on live sets with several contemporary heavy-weights like Johnny Dankworth, Ronnie Scott, Paul Robeson to name a few as well as popular Afro-Caribbean icons like Ambrose Campbell and Edmundo Ros. He is on record as having formed a long-standing partnership with the hugely popular pioneering Black Singer and Pianist Rita Cann and was part of the group of Black Intellectuals and musicians who met at African-American musician John Payne's Regent's Park flat. Rita Cann had actually been mentored by Fela Sowande.

He also recorded at least one single on the Afro-Caribbean Melodisc label, the track being "Ihin Rere" and Igi T'Olorun". Contemporary acts on this label being Lord Kitchener and Ambrose Campbell. He is also reputed to have dedicated a substantial part of his musical career to playing for Charity entertaining an Elderly audience- as a duo with Rita Cann, travelling around the UK for this purpose. His other compositions including the song Ara Eyo. He was also reputed to have written several short plays.

Legal career 
Tunji Sowande was called to the Bar in February 1952 and upon completing his pupillage, was informed by his mentor and Master of Chambers, Jeffrey Howard (later Judge Jeffrey Howard) that he had been offered a full Tenancy at the prestigious 3 Kings Bench Walk Chambers. His reaction was however that of surprise, since his own ambition was to pursue his musical career on completion of his studies. This is to be seen in the context of the fact that Tenancies in prestigious Chambers were not available to Black Barristers – the UK still being subject to the racial and class strictures attendant at the time. He initially refused it but subsequently accepted after pressure from his Pupil Master, who would not countenance a Lawyer of his exceptional intellect and ability doing otherwise than taking the opportunity of a career at the Bar.

Sowande went on to pursue a career at the Bar, specialising in Criminal Law. His only other Black contemporary at the Bar at the time being the Caribbean Barrister Learie Constantine, who was a professional Cricketer but who practised Law as a hobby and who had sued and won compensation from the Imperial Hotel, London in 1944 for barring him "on the grounds of colour". Constantine later became Trinidadian High Commissioner to London and indeed the UK's first Black Peer.

Well respected by colleagues and Benchers, he handled a large number of complex Criminal matters in the course of his career. He was often at the Central Criminal Court, Quarter Sessions, Chelmsford, St Albans, Hereford, Middlesex and others and was on the county prosecutors list in Essex.

He rose to the rank of Head of Chambers at 3 Kings Bench Walk after several years in 1968, making him the first Black Head of a major Barrister's Chambers set. In addition in April 1978, he became the first Black Deputy Circuit Judge (assistant Recorder) sitting initially at Snaresbrook and thereafter at 24 of the crown courts including Croydon, Inner London and Knightsbridge. He was appointed a Recorder (Judge) of the Crown Court, from where he retired on or about 1989. This certainly is the authoritative view thus contradicting the Black Lawyers Directory claim that Dr John Roberts was the first Black Judge, since his appointment was only in 1985, whereas Sowande became a Deputy Recorder seven years prior to this. Roberts was most certainly the first Black Queen's Counsel, a rank which Sowande had striven for but did not attain before his death.

Tunji Sowande assisted the careers of several Lawyers from minority backgrounds, including Kim Hollis QC, one of the UK's most popular Asian female Lawyers, who was given her opportunity of Tenancy by Tunji Sowande and indeed mentored her in the early stages of her career.

Socially, he was an active a member of the Hurlingham Club, Justice, Concert Artiste's Association, several Theatrical Societies, lifelong member of Marylebone Cricket Club and Crystal Palace Football Club.

He died in 1996 at the age of 84.

References 

 

20th-century Nigerian lawyers
1912 births
1996 deaths
Lawyers from Lagos
Alumni of King's College London
CMS Grammar School, Lagos alumni
Nigerian emigrants to the United Kingdom